Azcasuch was a cihuatlatoani (queen) of the pre-Columbian Acolhua altepetl of Tepetlaoztoc in the Valley of Mexico. Her name is Nahuatl for a kind of a flower (literally "ant-flower").

A daughter of Nezahualcoyotl, ruler of Texoco, Azcasuch married Cocopin, the ruler of Tepetlaoztoc. After her husband's death, she ascended to the throne herself as queen regnant.

Azcasuch was succeeded by her grandson, Diego Tlilpotonqui.

References

Year of birth missing
Year of death missing
Cihuatlatoque
16th-century women rulers